The Enchiridion (full title: Enchiridion symbolorum, definitionum et declarationum de rebus fidei et morum; "A handbook of symbols, definitions and declarations on matters of faith and morals"), usually translated as The Sources of Catholic Dogma, is a compendium of texts on Catholic theology and morality, some of which date back to the Apostolic Age. It has been first published in 1854, and has been regularly updated in subsequent editions since. It is sometimes referred to as Denzinger, after its first editor, Heinrich Joseph Dominicus Denzinger.

Name 
The name Enchiridion (from Greek cheir, "hand") means "handbook". It was riginally published as Enchiridion symbolorum et definitionum, quae de rebus fidei et morum a conciliis oecumenicis et summis pontificibus emanarunt. The work is today published as Enchiridion symbolorum, definitionum et declarationum de rebus fidei et morum.

The Enchiridion is sometimes referred to as Denzinger, after its first editor, Heinrich Joseph Dominicus Denzinger. It is commonly abbreviated 'D', 'D.', or 'Dz', as 'DS' in editions edited by Adolf Schönmetzer due to a revision in numbering ('DS' sometimes continues to be used as a general reference to even later editions), as 'DB' for editions edited by Clément Bannwart, and as 'DH' for editions edited by Peter Hünermann.

Structure
The Enchiridion is chronologically ordered, starting with the Symbolum Apostolicum. It includes the teachings of popes and ecumenical councils since. It does not repeat all the full texts, but only those central parts which are relevant to dogmatic or moral theology. All texts in Denzinger-Schönmetzer are listed in Latin.

Since the 37th edition of Denzinger-Hünermann (1991), the original language (mostly Latin) is put in the left-hand column with a corresponding vernacular translation in the right-hand column. 
 
In addition to the texts, the Enchiridion supplies certain indices: 
 Index scripturisticus, on the uses of scripture in various dogmas   
 Index systematicus of dogmatic and moral Church teachings 
 Index alphabeticus of names and subjects

References

External links
 
 
 
 
 

Latin text – documents to 1957
French translation – documents to 1959
Spanish translation – documents to 1957
English translation – documents to 1950 and old numbering only

1854 books
1854 in Christianity
Catechism of the Catholic Church